Herbert H. Henderson (June 23, 1929 – October 16, 2007) was an attorney and civil rights activist from Huntington, West Virginia. He was also president of the West Virginia National Association for the Advancement of Colored People (NAACP) for 20 years.

Family and education 
Henderson was born in McDowell County, West Virginia to John and Elnora Henderson. He graduated from West Virginia State College in 1953. He earned a Juris Doctor from George Washington University Law School in 1958, where he was the first black student to graduate. He was married to Maxine Henderson for 49 years. The couple had four daughters.

Legal career 
Henderson founded a law practice in Huntington, West Virginia after graduating from George Washington University Law School. Some of his notable cases include: NAACP vs. West Virginia Department of Public Safety which allowed African-American women to be admitted to the State Police. He was president of the West Virginia National Association for the Advancement of Colored People (NAACP) for 20 years from 1966 to 1986.  He was general counsel for the National NAACP in 1984 and again from 1989 through 1990.

Death, honors, and legacy 
Henderson died on October 16, 2007  He was preceded in death by his wife. Prior to his death, Henderson was honored with the NAACP William Robert Ming Advocacy Award in 1995 as someone who "exemplifies the spirit of financial and personal sacrifice that Ming displayed in his legal work for the NAACP." Three of the daughters followed his interest in law and are attorneys in Huntington. His daughter, Cheryl Henderson, is the first African American Municipal Judge in Huntington.

References 

American civil rights lawyers
Lawyers from Huntington, West Virginia
1929 births
2007 deaths
George Washington University Law School
People from McDowell County, West Virginia
West Virginia State University alumni
NAACP activists
Activists from West Virginia